These are the statistics of Austrian Football Bundesliga in the 1983–84 season.

Overview
The Bundesliga was contested by 16 teams, and FK Austria Wien won the championship. Union Wels was dissolved in February, with only sixteen matches played up to that point. all of their remaining matches were counted as walkovers.

Teams and location

Teams of 1983–84 Austrian Football Bundesliga
FC Admira/Wacker
Austria Salzburg
Austria Wien
Eisenstadt
Favoritner
Grazer AK
Kärnten
LASK
Neusiedl
Rapid Wien
Sankt Veit
Sturm Graz
Union Wels
VÖEST Linz
Wacker Innsbruck
Wiener Sport-Club

League standings

Results

References
Austria - List of final tables (RSSSF)

Austrian Football Bundesliga seasons
Austria
1983–84 in Austrian football